This is a list of the members of the Dewan Negara (Senate) of the First Parliament of the Federation of Malaya (known as the Parliament of Malaysia after 2 November 1963). There were 38 senators (22 are elected by the state legislative assemblies, with two senators for each state in the Federation, while the other 16 are appointed by the Yang di-Pertuan Agong (King)) in this initial parliament, increasing to 50 senators (25 are elected by the state legislative assemblies, with two senators for each state in the Federation, while the other 25 are appointed by the Yang di-Pertuan Agong (King)) after the establishment of the Parliament of Malaysia.

Elected by the State Legislative Assembly

Nominated by the Prime Minister and appointed by the Yang di-Pertuan Agong

Death in office
 Leong Yew Koh (d. 12 January 1963)
 Nik Mohamed Adeeb Nik Mohamed (d. 4 April 1964)

Footnotes

References

Malaysian parliaments
Lists of members of the Dewan Negara